Bindaas is a 2014 Indian  Bengali action drama film directed by Rajiv Kumar Biswas. It's a Shree Venkatesh Films production in association with Jalsha Movies Production. The film stars  Dev, Sayantika Banerjee, Srabanti Chatterjee and Chiranjeet Chakraborty. It is a remake of  the 2013 Telugu film Mirchi.

Plot
The movie begins with Abhi (Dev) practicing guitar when a girl runs to him and asks him to save her from a gang of goons chasing her. Then Abhi, without fighting, resolves the conflict. The girl introduces herself as Kajol (Sayantika Banerjee). They slowly become friends. But one day, she asks Abhi to leave her and go as she cannot stand the separation from him if their relationship develops any further. He then goes back to India and changes the mind of Kajol's brother, and when they give him a vacation, he goes with him to his village. There, where everyone are conservative in nature, he changes their nature and makes them more lovable.

When Kajol expresses her love for him, he tells his flashback. It is then revealed that he was born to their rival's family. His father (Chiranjeet Chakraborty) wanted to convert the people of his village. But his mother didn't want to stay there, so she left him. Later, when Abhi goes there, he falls in love with Anjali (Srabanti Chatterjee).

He starts taking revenge on the Kajol's family without revealing his identity. Then they decide to marry Abhi with Anjali because they both are in love with each other. During the marriage, the inspector tells his father that the hostility is rekindling because his son is taking revenge on the rivals. Soon afterwards, the rivals come and start killing everyone. After the fight, Abhi's mother dies. His father banishes him and blames her death on him. The story is now back to the present. Kajol's uncle challenges Abhi that if he can defeat his men, then he too would follow non violence. After successfully defeating them, her uncle asks Abhi that if he could defeat the rival's son (not knowing that it was Abhi himself), he would marry Kajol to Abhi.

Abhi gets angry at his stubbornness and reveals his true identity. He starts fighting with Kajol's uncle. Then all her family members come and convert him too. This was watched by his father, who had just arrived there. His father welcomes him back to the family. The film ends with him reuniting with Anjali.

Cast

 Dev as Abhimanyu Sen aka Abhi
 Srabanti Chatterjee as Anjali
 Sayantika Banerjee as Kajol
 Chiranjeet Chakraborty as Dibakar Sen, Abhi's father
 Kharaj Mukherjee as Krishnochandra Singha
 Indrani Majumdar as Nandini/ Abhi's mother
 Sudip Mukherjee as Shankar, Abhi's uncle
 Amitabh Bhattacharjee as Goon
 Raja Dutta as Rudra, Kajol's elder brother
 Surajit Sen as Indra 
 Supriyo Dutta as Kajol's Uncle
 Sumit Ganguly as Sukhdeb
 Tamal Roy Chowdhury as Rudra's Elder Brother
 Vashcar Dev as Bhava
 Raju Majumdar as Anjali's friend
 Madhumita Chakraborty as Kajol's mother
 Debomay Mukherjee as Sukhdeb's son
 Sunny Samarjit
 Esha Bhattacharya as Kajol's aunt
 Ashim Roy Chowdhury as Abhi's College Professor 
 Jayashree Mukherjee as Abhi's aunt
 Soma Banerjee as Sukhdeb's wife

Production
The shooting of the film started on 25 November 2013. It was produced by Shree Venkatesh Films and Jalsha Movies Production. The main script writer and director were Rajiv Kumar Biswas.

Soundtrack 

The soundtrack of the film was scored by Savvy, Arindam Chatterjee, Habib Wahid and Devi Sri Prasad.

References 

2014 films
Bengali remakes of Telugu films
Bengali-language Indian films
2010s Bengali-language films
2014 action drama films
2014 masala films
Indian action drama films
Films scored by Savvy Gupta
Films scored by Arindam Chatterjee
Films scored by Habib Wahid
Films about violence
Films directed by Rajiv Kumar Biswas